Ariadina Alves Borges  (born 28 December 1999), known simply as Ary Borges, is a Brazilian professional football forward who plays for National Women's Soccer League club Racing Louisville FC and the Brazil women's national team.

Club career
Ary Borges was born in São Luís, Maranhão but moved to São Paulo when she was ten years old. There she joined the youth team of Santos FC and was one of three girls who played alongside the boys. Her father signed a waiver indemnifying the club against legal action if she was injured in boys' football. At 11 years old she switched to Centro Olímpico and played in the girls' under-15 team, since there was no under-13s.

In 2017 and 2018 Ary Borges returned to her native Northeast Region to play two seasons of professional football with Sport Recife, before joining the newly re-formed São Paulo for 2019. She was an important player in the team promoted to the Campeonato Brasileiro de Futebol Feminino Série A1 and played up her credentials as a supporter of the club on social media, even staging a São Paulo FC-themed birthday party. The club was disappointed when she left after one year, for a better contract with rivals Palmeiras.

In 2022, Borges signed with American club Racing Louisville FC.

International career

She featured for the Brazil women's national under-20 football team at the 2018 South American U-20 Women's Championship and subsequent 2018 edition of the FIFA U-20 Women's World Cup.

She received her first call-up to the senior Brazil women's national football team in September 2020, selected by coach Pia Sundhage for a training camp at Nova Granja Comary which was restricted to home-based players due to the COVID-19 pandemic in Brazil. She won her first senior cap as a 63rd-minute substitute for Debinha in a 3–1 friendly win over Argentina at Amigão, Campina Grande, Paraíba on 17 September 2021. Another substitute appearance against the same opponents followed three days later, and she maintained her place in the squad for the next friendly fixtures against Australia in Sydney the following month. She scored her first two goals in a 6–1 win over India at the 2021 International Women's Football Tournament of Manaus, a match notable as the farewell appearance of Formiga.

International goals

Honours 
São Paulo 
Brasileirão Feminino A2: 2019

Palmeiras 
Copa Paulista: 2021
Copa Libertadores da América: 2022

Seleção Brasileira 
Copa América: 2022

References

External links
 

1999 births
Living people
People from São Luís, Maranhão
Brazilian women's footballers
Brazil women's international footballers
Women's association football forwards
Associação Desportiva Centro Olímpico players
Sociedade Esportiva Palmeiras (women) players
São Paulo FC (women) players
Racing Louisville FC players
Sportspeople from Maranhão